La Società Entomologica Italiana, the Italian Entomological Society, is Italy’s foremost society devoted to the study of insects. The society is famous for promoting applied entomology and many of its past members have saved millions from deadly diseases such as malaria.

History
The society was founded on 31 October 1869, near the "Regio Museo di Storia Naturale", the Royal Natural History Museum (effectively "Museo zoologico de La Specola") in Florence.

The Society had been promoted almost  two years before by a group of Italian and other scientists from various institutions across Italy. On 1 January 1868, 21 members of a committee called "Comitato dei Promotori della Società Entomologica Italiana" signed a "manifesto" letter. Coordinated by Alexander Enrico Haliday  were  four Academic Associates. Emilio Cornalia, then director of del Museo civico di Storia naturale di Milano, the author of works of applied entomology, such as "La Monografia del bombice del gelso" published in 1856; Giovanni Passerini, university professor of Botany at the Università di Parma;  Paolo Savi, director of  the "Museo zoologico dell'Università di Pisa", and author of "Ornitologia Toscana", Tuscany Birds (1827–1831), who had also promoted the first congress of Italian scientists,  Primo Congresso degli Scienziati Italiani at Pisa in 1839 an author of notes on breeding Samia cynthia, an alternative silk producer of optimal quality "shantung" and  Achille Costa, holder of the first chair of Entomology and director of Museo zoologico dell'Università di Napoli. Adolfo Targioni Tozzetti and Pietro Stefanelli are also listed as one of the Comitato. Fernandino Maria Piccioli was an editor.

The founding of the society was a part of the Risorgimento. In 1922 it moved to Genoa, to Museo Civico di Storia Naturale di Genova, where it is based until now.

La Società Entomologica Italiana collaborates with Unione Zoologica Italiana, the Italian Zoological Society in maintaining a website listing the Italian Fauna FaunaItalia.

Notable members 
Achille Costa
Raffaello Gestro
Giovanni Battista Grassi
Alexander Henry Haliday
Leonello Picco
Camillo Rondani
Ruggero Verity

References
Cesare Conci et Roberto Poggi (1996), Iconography of Italian Entomologists, with essential biographical data.Memorie della Società entomologica Italiana, 75 : 159-382.

External links
 Italian Entomological Society official website
BHL Parts of Bollettino della Società Entomologica Italiana

Entomological societies
Biology societies
Learned societies of Italy